Lakesia Collins is an American union organizer and politician serving as a Democratic member of the Illinois House of Representatives for the 9th district since her appointment on July 24, 2020. The 9th district includes parts of the Near West Side, the Near North Side and North Lawndale in Chicago. Collins won the Democratic primary election for the seat and ran unopposed in the general election in 2020. She serves as the Treasurer for the Illinois Legislative Black Caucus.

Early life and career 
Collins attended Proviso East High School in Maywood, Illinois and received her Certified Nursing Assistant certificate from the Samland Institute in Chicago. She worked as a nurse in nursing homes, and later became an organizer in her union, SEIU Healthcare Illinois. During her tenure as a union organizer, she advocated for legislation on nursing home reform, the proposed Illinois Fair Tax, and a higher minimum wage.

In October 2019, she began her campaign for the Illinois House of Representatives' 9th district in the 2020 election. Incumbent State Rep. Art Turner had decided not to run for re-election after holding the seat since 2011 (Turner's father, Arthur Turner, had previously held the seat for more than 30 years). Collins faced six other candidates in the Democratic primary election, including Aaron Turner, brother of the incumbent representative. She was supported by several labor unions including SEIU Healthcare Illinois and the Chicago Teachers Union and progressive organizations such as United Working Families, and received endorsements from the Chicago Sun-Times local elected officials such as Byron Sigcho-Lopez, Jeanette Taylor, and Brandon Johnson. On March 17, 2020, she won the primary election with 45.9% of the vote. On July 24, 2020, after the resignation of Turner, she was appointed to serve out the remainder of his term. She ran unopposed in the general election on November 3, 2020, and won a full term that began in January 2021. She is the first woman to represent the 9th district.

As of July 3, 2022, Representative Collins is a member of the following Illinois House committees:

 Appropriations - Public Safety Committee (HAPP)
 Child Care Accessibility & Early Childhood Education Committee (HCEC)
 Housing Committee (SHOU)
 Human Services Committee (HHSV)
 Labor & Commerce Committee (HLBR)
 Public Benefits Subcommittee (HHSV-PUBX)
 Workforce Development Subcommittee (HLBR-WORK)

Personal life 
Collins is a single mother of three children.

Electoral history

References 

Living people
Year of birth missing (living people)
21st-century American politicians
21st-century American women politicians
Democratic Party members of the Illinois House of Representatives
Women state legislators in Illinois
American nurses
American women nurses